Parliamentary elections were held in the Republic of Dahomey on 19 January 1964. They followed a coup in October 1963 and a subsequent constitutional referendum on 5 January 1964. The Dahomeyan Democratic Party (PDD) was the only party to contest the elections, and won all 42 seats in the National Assembly.

The leader of the winning party would automatically become president. As head of the PDD list, Sourou-Migan Apithy was elected who previously served as one of ministers in the post-coup transitional government of Christophe Soglo. Justin Ahomadégbé-Tomêtin was elected as deputy president of the republic and prime minister. He formed a new government on 25 January.

Results

References

Dahomey
Elections in Benin
1964 in the Republic of Dahomey
1964 election
One-party elections
Election and referendum articles with incomplete results